The SA-85 is an AK-pattern rifle made by Fegyver És Gépgyár (F.E.G.) of Hungary. It was sold in a "sporting" configuration to get around U.S. gun laws at the time.  It was also imported into the United Statespre-banin two variants, a solid thumbhole style stock and a underfolder stock that folded under the rifle.  This rifle is a semi-automatic version of the Russian AK-47, with a strange thumb-hole butt-stock, helping to make it a legal hunting rifle in the United States.  It was a preferred choice of Kalashnikov style rifles over the cheaper but inferior, Chinese models.

The SA-58 is a semi-automatic version of the Russian AK-47, with a thumbhole buttstock, helping to make it a legal hunting rifle in the United States.

7.62×39mm semi-automatic rifles
Fegyver- és Gépgyár firearms